Koh-i-Takatu (Takatu Mount ”) is a Mount peak located in the Sulaiman Mountains range, in the North east of Quetta District of Balochistan Province, in western Pakistan.

The highest peak of this Mountain range is Loai Saar or (Lwarrh Saar) , it is the second highest peak of Quetta District, and third highest peak of Balochistan.

Wildlife Kohi-i-Takatu 
Koh-i-Takatu has different kinds of wild animals living in the mountains, the wild animals have reported are including wolf, fox buck, jackals, rabbits, birds and well known endangered species of the Suleman markhor (mountain goats found in Balochistan).

See also 
 List of mountains in Pakistan
 Mountain ranges of Pakistan

References

External links
 Mount Chiltan at Wikimapia.com
 Ncbi.nlm.nih.gov

Sulaiman Mountains
Mountains of Balochistan (Pakistan)
Quetta District
Three-thousanders of the Hindu Kush